The Edsel was an automobile manufactured by Ford Motor Company, named after Edsel Ford, son of Henry Ford.

Edsel or Edsell may also refer to:


People
Edsel (given name), a list of people so named
Edsel Dope (born 1974), stage name of singer and songwriter Brian Charles Ebejer
Robert M. Edsel (born 1956), American writer and businessman
Wilson C. Edsell (1814-1900), American politician, lawyer and banker

Music
The Edsels, an American doo-wop group of the late 1950s and early 1960s
Edsel (band), an American indie rock/post-hardcore band
Edsel Records, a London reissue label formed in 1979 and now owned by Demon Music Group

Places
Edsel, Kentucky, an unincorporated community

See also
Edsall (disambiguation)